Zagreb County is a county in Northern Croatia. It surrounds, but does not contain, the nation's capital Zagreb, which is a separate territorial unit. For that reason, the county is often nicknamed "Zagreb ring". According to the 2011 census, the county has 317,606 inhabitants, most of whom live in smaller urban satellite towns.

The Zagreb County once included the city of Zagreb, but in 1997 they separated, when the City was given a special status. Although separated from the city of Zagreb both administratively and territorially, it remains closely linked with it.

Zagreb County borders on Krapina-Zagorje County, the city of Zagreb, Varaždin County, and Koprivnica-Križevci County in the north, Bjelovar-Bilogora County in the east, Sisak-Moslavina County in the south and Karlovac County in the southwest.

Franjo Tuđman Airport is located on the territory of Zagreb County, the biggest and most important airport in the country.

Administrative divisions 

Zagreb County is divided into 9 towns and 25 municipalities.

County government

Current Župan: Stjepan Kožić (HSS)

The county assembly is composed of 45 representatives, organized as follows:

 Croatian Democratic Union (HDZ)/Croatian Peasants Party (HSS)/ HSU - 21
 Social Democratic Party of Croatia (SDP)/Croatian People's Party (HNS)/ Democratic Centre (DC) / HSLS - 19
 SU - 3
 HSP - 2

Demographics

See also
 Zagreb County (former)
 :Category:Former counties of Croatia

References

External links
 Zagrebačka županija Official website
 Zagreb county tourist board

 
Geography of Zagreb
Counties of Croatia